Libyan Civil War may refer to:

 Tripolitanian civil war, a conflict from 1793 to 1795 in what is today Libya
 1920 Jabal al-Gharbi civil war, a conflict in the Nafusa Mountains in what is today Libya
 First Libyan Civil War, armed conflict in 2011 between forces loyal to Colonel Muammar Gaddafi and foreign supported groups seeking to oust his government
 Second Libyan Civil War, multi-sided civil war in Libya from 2014 to 2020

See also
 Libyan Crisis (2011–present), humanitarian crisis and political-military instability since 2011, including the Arab Spring and First Libyan Civil War
 Factional violence in Libya (2011–2014), a period of violence in Libya following the First Libyan Civil War and preceding the Second Libyan Civil War
 Libyan War (disambiguation)